The 2014 Latin Cup was the 27th edition of the Latin Cup, an international youth roller hockey tournament organised by the Comité Européen de Rink-Hockey. It was held in Viana do Castelo, Portugal, from 17 to 19 April 2014. Portugal won the competition for the first time since 2008, securing their 13th title.

Results

Standings

Matches

Top Scorers

See also
 Roller Hockey
 CERH

References

2014 in roller hockey
2014 in Portuguese sport
International roller hockey competitions hosted by Portugal